Hugo Burkhardt (born 1910; date of death unknown) was a Swiss footballer who played for Concordia Basel and FC Basel. He played as goalkeeper.

Burkhardt was the main goalkeeper for Concordia Basel during the 1933–34 and 1934–35 Nationalliga seasons. After Concordia suffered relegation, Burkhardt joined Basel's first team for their 1935–36 season. He played his domestic league debut for the club in the away game on 25 August 1935 as Basel lost 2–3 against St. Gallen.

During that season Burkhardt played a total of 12 games for Basel. Eight of these games were in the Nationalliga, one in the Swiss Cup and three were friendly games.

References

Sources
 Rotblau: Jahrbuch Saison 2017/2018. Publisher: FC Basel Marketing AG. 
 Die ersten 125 Jahre. Publisher: Josef Zindel im Friedrich Reinhardt Verlag, Basel. 
 Verein "Basler Fussballarchiv" Homepage

FC Concordia Basel players
FC Basel players
Swiss men's footballers
Association football goalkeepers
1910 births
Year of death missing